Allonnes may refer to:

 Allonnes, Eure-et-Loir, a commune of the Eure-et-Loir département in France
 Allonnes, Maine-et-Loire, a commune of the Maine-et-Loire département in France
 Allonnes, Sarthe, a commune of the Sarthe département in France

See also
 Allonne (disambiguation)
 Allons (disambiguation)